Rizitika songs (Greek: Ριζίτικα τραγούδια) are the oldest type of Cretan music. They mainly originate from Western Crete, but are also widespread in central and eastern Crete. Rizes (Greek: ρίζες = roots) are the foothills of the mountains. One view says that from the roots of the mountains those songs took their name, from Ida, Dikti and the White Mountains. Another view argues that «the songs of the roots» of the ancestors, were called by the people Rizitika. were small settlements at the mountain peaks supervising coasts that were considered dangerous for landing of invaders. The meaning of λουβο- of the word λουβοσαρακηνός seems to have been lost in time.

The following song is the most well-known Rizitiko outside Crete, its subject is a 16th-century vendetta, among possibly the family of Γιάνναρης, and the one of Μουσούρος, whom the song refers to in all of its variants. Μουσούρος family and their place of residence are also mentioned in Venetian sources of the 16th century, not with good comments. The earliest version of the song was as following:

The song became known in Greece in the following form and was associated with wars and struggles in the mainland Greece of the 20th century.

References

Sources

Bibliography
Το Ηράκλειον και ο Νομός του, εκδ. Νομ. Ηρακλείου.
Βλαζάκης Μιχαήλ, Ριζίτικα Τραγούδια Κρήτης, Χανιά, 1961.
Παπαγρηγοράκη Ιδομενέως, Τα Κρητικά ριζίτικα τραγούδια, Χανιά 1957.
Mανώλης Γασπαράκης,Tο ιδανικό της προσωπικής αρετής στο ριζίτικο τραγούδι: προτροπή για αρετή,Κρητολογικά Γράμματα, τόμ. 13 (1997), pp. 319–325

External links

Songs
Αγρίμια κι αγριμάκια μου - Νίκος Ξυλούρης Ferals, my little ferals           
Αγρίμια κι αγριμάκια μου - Συμφωνική Ορχήστρα Αθηνών Ferals, my little ferals (Orchestral, no lyrics)    
Σε ψηλό βουνό - Κώστας Μουντάκης
Κάστρο και που 'ναι οι πύργοι σου - Κώστας Μουντάκης Castle, where are your towers (He only singing the first two verses of the original)
Ο Διγενής - Νίκος Ξυλούρης Digenes
Μάνα κι αν έρθουν οι φίλοι μου - Νίκος Ξυλούρης

Cretan music
Culture of Crete
Greek styles of music

fr:Lyra (instrument)#Lyra crétoise